The Malaysian Minister of Human Resources is V. Sivakumar since 3 December 2022. The minister was supported by Deputy Minister of Human Resources which is Mustapha Sakmud. The Minister administers the portfolio through the Ministry of Human Resources.

List of ministers of human resources
The following individuals have been appointed as Minister of Human Resources, or any of its precedent titles:

Political Party:

List of ministers of labour
The following individuals have been appointed as Minister of Labour, or any of its precedent titles:

Political Party:

List of ministers of labour and manpower
The following individuals have been appointed as Minister of Labour and Manpower, or any of its precedent titles:

Political Party:

References

Ministry of Human Resources (Malaysia)
Lists of government ministers of Malaysia
Malaysia